Arthrostylidium scandens is a species of Arthrostylidium bamboo in the grass family.

Description 
Arthrostylidium scandens has 3 Lodicules, 3 anthers, 2 stigmas. The species grows to 500–800 cm long.

Distribution 
The species is common to northern South America.

References 

scandens